is a Japanese politician serving in the House of Representatives in the Diet (national legislature) as a member of the Liberal Democratic Party. A native of Arakawa, Tokyo and high school graduate she was elected to the Diet for the first time in September 2005 after unsuccessfully running for mayor of Saitama, Saitama in May 2005.

References 
 

Members of the House of Representatives (Japan)
Female members of the House of Representatives (Japan)
Koizumi Children
People from Tokyo
Living people
1949 births
Liberal Democratic Party (Japan) politicians
21st-century Japanese women politicians